

Changes for the 2005 season
 Keiichi Tsuchiya being the sole judge, with Manabu Orido leaving his spot to become a D1GP competitor.
 The introduction of the DriftBox being used as a judging aid.
 A points scoring system is introduced which drivers are awarded 10 to 0 depending to their performance to the rival, 10-0 being the highest and 5-5 is considered a draw, as a result, it is up to the judges to call for a sudden death match, if the score becomes too close. The scoring system was used briefly in 2003 and 2004 seasons.
 10th place no longer jointly awarded points as was the case in prior seasons—1pt now awarded to the best six drivers of the best 16 tsuiso round.

2005 Schedules
n.b. Winning Driver are mentioned on the right

2005 D1 Grand Prix Point Series
Round 1 - February 26/27 - Irwindale Speedway, Irwindale, California, USA - Yasuyuki Kazama (S15)
Round 2 - April 16 - Metropolitan Parking, Odaiba, Japan - Katsuhiro Ueo (AE86)
Round 3 - May 7/8 - Sports Land SUGO, Miyagi Prefecture, Japan - Yasuyuki Kazama (S15)
Round 4 - August 6/7 - Autopolis, Ōita Prefecture, Japan - Toshiki Yoshioka (AE85)
Round 5 - August 20/21 - Ebisu South Course, Fukushima Prefecture, Japan - Yasuyuki Kazama (S15)
Round 6 - October 22/23 - Fuji Speedway, Shizuoka Prefecture, Japan - Masao Suenaga (FD3S)
Round 7 - November 20 - Tsukuba Circuit, Ibaraki Prefecture, Japan - Youichi Imamura (FD3S)

2005 D1 Grand Prix Exhibition Matches
D1 Odaiba Allstar Exhibition - April 17 - Metropolitan Parking, Odaiba, Japan - Youichi Imamura (FD3S)
D1 Street Legal Exhibition - August 20/21 - Ebisu South Course, Fukushima Prefecture, Japan - Naoto Suenaga (S15)
D1 UK Exhibition - October 2 - Silverstone, England - Ryuji Miki (S15)
D1 Street Legal Exhibition 2 - November 20 - Tsukuba Circuit, Ibaraki Prefecture, Japan - Kazuto Ichiyanagi (RPS13)
D1 USA vs Japan Allstar Exhibition - December 17 - Irwindale Speedway, Irwindale, California, USA - Vaughn Gittin Jr. (MUSTANG)

Race Reports

USA vs Japan All Star Exhibition
This event was originally were to be run at the same Auto Club Speedway as a double bill of the GT Live event, but due to unforeseen circumstances. The JGTC organisers cancelled the event and the D1GP event were moved to Irwindale.

During the USA vs Japan All Star Exhibition event in December, the organisers, rather than running the course the usual anti-clockwise route that is found in ovals, the course was run in the other direction. Many drivers had trouble adjusting to the new track change, including Ken Nomura, the Import drag racing star Stephan Papadakis on his debut drifting season and Rhys Millen who all crashed during qualifying. One notable debuts was the father of Rhys, Rod Millen, the rallying and Pikes Peak legend, with all the thirty year motorsport experiences he gained, he broke into the last 16 on his first ever D1 outing in his Mazda RX-8. After a long break from his Last 16 appearance at round 1 in 2004 due to competing in a Dodge Viper Competition Coupe, which rendered him ineligible for participation, Samuel Hubinette would make a return with his SRT-10 at the last 16 along with Alex Pfeiffer and Tanner Foust.

The event was mainly noted for having a non Japanese driver and car to win over the Japanese who usually dominates all the D1 events. Vaughn Gittin Jr took first place after defeating Tatsuya Sakuma, who was driving an APP Racing Silvia S15 with his Falken Tire sponsored Ford Mustang GT through a One More Time rerun. He also defeated two championship winners (Yasuyuki Kazama and Youichi Imamura) en route.

Final Championship Results

Source: D1GP Official Site 2005 Championship table

See also
 D1 Grand Prix
 Drifting (motorsport)

Sources
D1GP Results Database 2005

D1 Grand Prix seasons
D1 Grand Prix
2005 in Japanese motorsport